Tunbridge Wells; Or, A Day's Courtship is a 1678 comedy play generally attributed to the English writer Thomas Rawlins. It was originally staged at the Dorset Garden Theatre in London by the Duke's Company. The names of the original actors are not known. It did not enjoy the same success as Rawlins' earlier work Tom Essence.

It takes place in the spa town Tunbridge Wells. There a man-about-town Owmuch sets up a couple of London prostitutes posing as a rich widow and her maid, in the hope of collecting the courtship gifts offer by gentleman suitors. However, he sees a larger scam in tricking a foppish and idiotic baronet Sir Lofty Vainman into marrying her.

A later work Tunbridge Walks staged in the 1700s was also set in the town.

References

Bibliography
 Canfield, J. Douglas. Tricksters and Estates: On the Ideology of Restoration Comedy. University Press of Kentucky, 2014.
 Hembry, Phyllis May . The English Spa, 1560-1815: A Social History. Fairleigh Dickinson Univ Press, 1990.
 Van Lennep, W. The London Stage, 1660-1800: Volume One, 1660-1700. Southern Illinois University Press, 1960.

1678 plays
West End plays
Restoration comedy
Plays set in England